Puto is a 2021 Philippine television fantasy comedy series broadcast by TV5. The series is a sequel to the 1987 Philippine film of the same title. Directed by Raynier Brizuela, it stars Herbert Bautista and McCoy de Leon. It aired from June 19 to September 11, 2021, on the network's Todo Max Weekend line up replacing 1000 Heartbeats: Pintig Pinoy and re-run on July 16, 2022, as part of Sari-Sari: Presents Viva Cinema.

Plot
The story takes place years after the original movie, where Puto is a single father to his son Uno, who realizes he is half-duwende. Uno, like his father was constantly bullied by Nico and his other classmates in college. Confronted by challenges in life, Uno discovers that he has magical powers which can shake the lives of people around him. The duwende trio, who were rescued by Puto, take on human form as Mamitas to take care of Uno.

Cast

Main cast
 Herbert Bautista as Ivanhoe “Puto” Dela Cruz
 McCoy de Leon as Juan “Uno” Dela Cruz

Supporting cast
 Lassy Marquez as Mamita
 MC Calaquian as Mamita
 Chad Kinis as Mamita
 Rafa Siguion-Reyna as Ramon
 Andrea Babierra as Alex
 Bob Jbeili as Elong
 Carlyn Ocampo as Joy
 Andrew Muhlach as Nico
 Caleb Santos as Troy
 TJ Valderrama as Edwen
 Billy Villeta as Itaban
 Giovanni Respal as Markadan
 Janno Gibbs as Juanito
 Gelli de Belen as Mindy
 Bing Loyzaga as Tere
 Wilbert Ross as Johnston

Episodes

References

2021 Philippine television series debuts
2021 Philippine television series endings
2020s Philippine television series
Filipino-language television shows
Philippine comedy television series
Philippine fantasy television series
TV5 (Philippine TV network) drama series
Television series by Viva Television